Samuel Woodrow Cathcart (July 7, 1924 – April 3, 2015) was an American football halfback and defensive back who played for the San Francisco 49ers. He played college football at the University of California, Santa Barbara, having previously attended Long Beach Polytechnic High School in Long Beach, California. He was the brother of Royal Cathcart, who also played for the 49ers. He died of cancer in hospital in 2015.
There is another Samuel Cathcart also known as "Samul Cathcart" or Sam. He is known for being TAll and long. Samul is also mentioned in the San Diego "Rock Band" EchoHead's
song "Samuel motherf**ing Cathcart".

References

1924 births
2015 deaths
American football halfbacks
UC Santa Barbara Gauchos football players
San Francisco 49ers players
Players of American football from Oklahoma
People from Washita County, Oklahoma
Deaths from cancer in California